Beat Wabel (born 23 May 1967) is a Swiss former professional cyclist. He competed in the men's cross-country mountain biking event at the 1996 Summer Olympics.

Professional from 1991 to 2005, he won the UCI Junior Cyclo-cross World Championships in 1985 and the Swiss National Cyclo-cross Championships five times. He also won a bronze medal in the elite race at the 1995 UCI World Championships.

He is the brother of Yvonne Schnorf-Wabel.

Major results

Cyclo-cross

1984–1985
 1st  UCI World Junior Championships
1990–1991
 Superprestige
1st Wetzikon
1991–1992
 1st  National Championships
 Superprestige
3rd Wetzikon
 4th UCI World Championships
1992–1993
 Superprestige
1st Eschenbach
 7th UCI World Championships
1993–1994
 Superprestige
3rd Diegem
3rd Wetzikon
3rd Plzeň
1994–1995
 2nd National Championships
 Superprestige
2nd Wetzikon
 3rd  UCI World Championships
1995–1996
 2nd National Championships
 3rd Overall UCI World Cup
3rd Variano di Basiliano
1996–1997
 1st Hittnau
 3rd National Championships
1997–1998
 1st  National Championships
 1st Hittnau
 UCI World Cup
3rd Eschenbach
1998–1999
 1st Hittnau
 2nd National Championships
 UCI World Cup
3rd Eschenbach
1999–2000
 1st  National Championships
 1st Igorre
 1st Dagmersellen
 1st Hittnau
 3rd Steinmaur
2000–2001
 1st  National Championships
 2nd Igorre
2001–2002
 1st Hittnau
 2nd Dagmersellen
 3rd National Championships
 3rd Steinmaur
2002–2003
 1st  National Championships
 2nd Dagmersellen
 2nd Hittnau

MTB
1993
 UCI XCO World Cup
1st Vail
1997
 2nd National XCO Championships
 3rd  European XCO Championships
1998
 3rd National XCO Championships

References

External links

1967 births
Living people
Swiss male cyclists
Olympic cyclists of Switzerland
Cyclists at the 1996 Summer Olympics
People from Wetzikon
Cyclo-cross cyclists
Swiss mountain bikers
Sportspeople from the canton of Zürich